The 2020–21 Green Bay Phoenix men's basketball team represented the University of Wisconsin–Green Bay in the 2020–21 NCAA Division I men's basketball season. The Phoenix, led by first-year head coach Will Ryan, played their home games at the Kress Events Center in Green Bay, Wisconsin as members of the Horizon League.

Previous season
The Phoenix finished the 2019–20 season 17–16, 11–7 in Horizon League play to finish in third place. They defeated Oakland in the quarterfinals of the Horizon League tournament before losing in the semifinals to Northern Kentucky.

On May 17, 2020, head coach Linc Darner was fired. He finished at Green Bay with a five-year record of 92–80.

Roster

Schedule and results

|-
!colspan=12 style=| Non-conference regular season

|-
!colspan=9 style=| Horizon League regular season

|-
!colspan=12 style=| Horizon League tournament
|-

|-

Source

References

Green Bay Phoenix men's basketball seasons
Green Bay Phoenix
Green Bay Phoenix men's basketball
Green Bay Phoenix men's basketball